Goddard is a city in Sedgwick County, Kansas, United States, and a west suburb of Wichita.  As of the 2020 census, the population of the city was 5,084.

History

There, he established the town of Goddard in honor of J. F. Goddard, former third vice-president of the ATSF Railway. The railroad reached Goddard in 1884, and a post office was established there the same year. Several buildings were relocated from Blendon, including the town hall and the planned Methodist church. Goddard was officially incorporated in 1910.

On June 23, 1969, an F4 tornado struck Goddard. No fatalities occurred, but six people were injured.

In recent decades as Wichita has expanded westward, a growing number of commuters have settled in Goddard, transforming it from a rural agricultural community into a suburb.

Geography
Goddard is located at  (37.659706, -97.574271) at an elevation of 1,463 feet (446 m). Goddard lies on U.S. Route 54 in south-central Kansas immediately west of Wichita.

Demographics

Goddard is part of the Wichita, KS Metropolitan Statistical Area.

2010 census
As of the 2010 United States Census, there were 4,344 people, 1,442 households, and 1,124 families residing in the city. The racial makeup of the city was 91.5% White, 1.2% Asian, 0.9% African American, 0.8% American Indian, 2.6% from other races, and 3.1% from two or more races. Hispanics and Latinos of any race were 6.4% of the population.

There were 1,442 households, of which 49.5% had children under the age of 18 living with them, 63.5% were married couples living together, 9.8% had a female householder with no husband present, 4.6% had a male householder with no wife present, and 22.1% were non-families. 18.5% of all households were made up of individuals, and 5.4% had someone living alone who was 65 years of age or older. The average household size was 2.98, and the average family size was 3.44.

The median age in the city was 29.5 years. 35.1% of residents were under the age of 18; 6.7% were between the ages of 18 and 24; 33.4% were from 25 to 44; 18.1% were from 45 to 64; and 6.7% were 65 years of age or older. The gender makeup of the city was 48.9% male and 51.1% female.

The median income for a household in the city was $65,139, and the median income for a family was $66,533. Males had a median income of $51,058 versus $33,542 for females. The per capita income for the city was $22,095. About 3.7% of families and 5.0% of the population were below the poverty line, including 5.1% of those under age 18 and 7.1% of those age 65 or over.

2000 census
As of the census of 2000, there were 2,037 people, 666 households, and 534 families residing in the city. The racial makeup of the city was 95.14% White, 0.29% African American, 0.98% Native American, 0.74% Asian, 0.05% Pacific Islander, 0.59% from other races, and 2.21% from two or more races. Hispanic or Latino of any race were 1.91% of the population.

There were 666 households, out of which 49.5% had children under the age of 18 living with them, 64.4% were married couples living together, 10.4% had a female householder with no husband present, and 19.8% were non-families. 17.1% of all households were made up of individuals, and 5.1% had someone living alone who was 65 years of age or older. The average household size was 2.94 and the average family size was 3.34.

In the city, the population was spread out, with 33.4% under the age of 18, 7.7% from 18 to 24, 29.8% from 25 to 44, 18.9% from 45 to 64, and 10.2% who were 65 years of age or older. The median age was 33 years. For every 100 females, there were 93.3 males. For every 100 females age 18 and over, there were 88.2 males.

The median income for a household in the city was $50,352, and the median income for a family was $53,690. Males had a median income of $39,881 versus $23,807 for females. The per capita income for the city was $18,957. About 2.6% of families and 3.6% of the population were below the poverty line.

Economy
As of 2012, 75.9% of the population over the age of 16 was in the labor force. 0.5% was in the armed forces, and 75.3% was in the civilian labor force with 70.4% being employed and 5.0% unemployed. The composition, by occupation, of the employed civilian labor force was:  40.3% in management, business, science, and arts; 22.5% in sales and office occupations; 17.1% in service occupations; 11.6% in production, transportation, and material moving; and 8.4% in natural resources, construction, and maintenance. The three industries employing the largest percentages of the working civilian labor force were:  manufacturing (22.7%); educational services, health care, and social assistance (20.9%); and retail trade (12.4%).

The cost of living in Goddard is relatively low; compared to a U.S. average of 100, the cost of living index for the city is 84.5. As of 2012, the median home value in the city was $140,400, the median selected monthly owner cost was $1,341 for housing units with a mortgage and $373 for those without, and the median gross rent was $1,013.

Government
Goddard is a city of the second class with a hybrid Council-Manager form of government.  The city council consists of five council members and establish the policies and legislation of the city with the mayor acting as the presiding city council member of city council meetings.  The city council meets twice a month.

2023 controversy
In 2023, there was a controversy over ex-mayor Hunter Larkin, at that time a council person, engineering a council vote to regain his mayor position.

Education

Primary and secondary education
Goddard USD 265 operates eleven schools in and around the city:

 Amelia Earhart Elementary School (Grades K-4)
 Clark Davidson Elementary School (K-4)
 Explorer Elementary School (K-4)
 Oak Street Elementary School (K-4)
 Apollo Elementary School (K-4)
 Challenger Intermediate School (5-6)

 Discovery Intermediate School (5-6)
 Eisenhower Middle School (7-8)
 Goddard Middle School (7-8)
 Eisenhower High School (9-12)
 Goddard High School (9-12)
 Goddard Academy (9-12)

The Roman Catholic Diocese of Wichita operates one Catholic school in Goddard: Holy Spirit Catholic School (Pre-K-8).

Libraries
The Goddard Public Library, located downtown, has a collection of over 28,000 volumes and offers technology services and literacy programs to the public.

Infrastructure

Transportation
U.S. Route 54 and U.S. Route 400 run concurrently east-west through Goddard.

Utilities
The city government's Public Works Department is responsible for both water provision and waste water management. Westar Energy provides electric power. Most residents use natural gas for heating fuel; service is provided by Kansas Gas Service.

Media
Goddard is in both the Wichita radio and television markets.

Parks and recreation
The city government maintains two parks in the community, a zoo, as well as a municipal swimming pool.

Culture

Events
Goddard's Chamber of Commerce, Lions Clubs International Lions Club, and city government organize many community events during the year including an Lions Club Car show/Easter Egg Hunt, Neighbors United, Garage Sale Days, Independence Day Firework Display, National Night Out, Fall Festival, Goddard Community Gatherings, Community Thanksgiving Feast, and Christmas on Main Street.

Points of interest
Tanganyika Wildlife Park, a privately owned zoo specializing in the breeding of endangered species, is located in Goddard. The Park is open yearly from April to October.

Blast Off Bay Water Park, a new indoor waterpark opening in March 2023, located next to the Genesis Sports fields and Hampton Inn. 

Genesis Sports Fields host baseball/softball tournaments on the 10 fields almost every weekend February - November. 

Lake Afton Public Observatory, a volunteer-run Observatory open to the public on weekend nights, is located south of Goddard.

Notable people

Notable individuals who were born in and/or have lived in Goddard include:
 Derek Norris (1989- ), baseball catcher
 Ed Siever (1875-1920), baseball pitcher
 Todd Tiahrt (1951- ), U.S. Representative from Kansas
 Logan Watkins (1989- ), baseball 2nd baseman

See also
 Lake Afton

References

Further reading

External links

 City of Goddard
 Goddard - Directory of Public Officials
 Goddard Chamber of Commerce
 Goddard city map, KDOT

Cities in Kansas
Cities in Sedgwick County, Kansas
Wichita, KS Metropolitan Statistical Area
Populated places established in 1883
1883 establishments in Kansas